Cneoglossidae is a family of beetles in the superfamily Byrrhoidea, containing nine described species in a single genus, Cneoglossa, which are native to the Neotropics from Mexico to Brazil. The larvae develop inside rotting submerged branches found in small fast flowing shallow streams.

Taxonomy 
 Cneoglossa brevis Champion, 1897
 Cneoglossa collaris Guérin-Méneville, 1849
 Cneoglossa elongata Pic, 1916
 Cneoglossa gournellei Pic, 1916
 Cneoglossa lampyroides Champion, 1897
 Cneoglossa longipennis (Pic, 1915)
 Cneoglossa peruviana Pic, 1916
 Cneoglossa rufifrons Pic, 1916
 Cneoglossa testacericollis Pic, 1916

References

Polyphaga families
Byrrhoidea
Monogeneric insect families